Terrycarlessia turbinata, the Glossy Turban Carnivorous Snail is a species of air-breathing land snail found in Australia. The natural range is from the Barrington Tops region in New South Wales to about Nambour in south-eastern Queensland. However, the snail has been recorded in Sydney as an invasive species.

References

 Stanisic, J.; Shea, M.; Potter, D.; Griffiths, O. (2010). Australian land snails. Volume 1. A field guide to eastern Australian species. Queensland Museum, Brisbane. 596 pp.

Rhytididae
Gastropods described in 2010
Molluscs of Australia